Curium(III) nitrate is an inorganic compound, a salt of curium and nitric acid with the chemical formula Cm(NO3)3.

Synthesis
Reaction of curium and nitric acid:

Physical properties
Curium(III) nitrate is a solid that exists as a hydrate or anhydrate, depending on the synthesis. The hydrates melt at 90 and 180 °C in crystallization water. The anhydrate decomposes to curium(IV) oxide at temperatures above 400 °C.

Applications
Curium(III) nitrate can be used to make curium(IV) oxide.

References

Curium compounds
Nitrates